The Fred Vonder Ahe House or Von der Ahe House was built in 1869 in the small community of Carus, Oregon, near Molalla for German immigrant Fred Vonder Ahe and his wife Marie Louisa Kleine Vonder Ahe. Fred arrived in New York in 1852 and followed the Oregon Trail to Oregon. He saved enough to acquire a  farm in 1857, and sent for his fiancé Marie to join him in 1858. In 1887 the house became the Carus post office, as it was the oldest and most significant house in the community. In 1972 the house was under threat of demolition. It was acquired by the Molalla Area Historical Society and moved to a site in Molalla next to the Horace L. Dibble House.

The Vonder Ahe House is described as a vernacular interpretation of the Federal style. It is an unusual example of a two-story plank house with well-preserved interior details. The associated summer house was moved with the main house to the new site. The house and summer kitchen were placed on the National Register of Historic Places on March 26, 1976. Both the Vonder Ahe House and the Dibble House are operated as a museum by the Molalla Area Historical Society.

References

External links
 Molalla Area Historical Society - official site
Von der Ahe House at the City of Molalla

National Register of Historic Places in Clackamas County, Oregon
Houses completed in 1868
Historic house museums in Oregon
1868 establishments in Oregon
Houses in Clackamas County, Oregon
Museums in Clackamas County, Oregon